The federalization of Yemen is the proposed transformation of the Republic of Yemen from a unitary state to a federal state. Driven by the significant economic, religious, political, and historical differences between the northern and southern parts of the country, federalization has been a common and controversial proposal to resolve regionalist tensions since the unification of the country in 1990.

Early history
In 1962, the British Aden Protectorate was transformed into the Federation of South Arabia, which initially contained 15 states. The country became South Yemen, a unitary state, in 1967. After South Yemen unified with North Yemen in 1990, the new government was quickly divided over the issue of decentralization, with the Yemeni Socialist Party expressing support for a federal system while the General People's Congress opposed it. While an agreement was eventually reached to decentralize the country, it was largely abandoned following the outbreak of a civil war in 1994. Decentralization continued to find popularity among members of the Yemeni opposition, and the opposition coalition known as the Joint Meeting Parties expressed interest in federalism in 2009.

Hadi plan

The 2013–2014 National Dialogue Conference concluded that Yemen would adopt federalism in an attempt to resolve the political crisis that began with the Yemeni Revolution in 2011. Under the federal system, Yemen's full name would become the Federal Republic of Yemen. A committee organized by Yemeni President Abdrabbuh Mansur Hadi determined that Yemen would be split into six federal regions: Azal, Saba, Tihama, Aden, Janad, and Hadhramaut. Azal, Saba, Janad and Tihama would have been northern provinces whereas Aden and Hadhramaut would have been southern. Sana’a, the capital, was to become a federal city and would not have been part of any region. Aden, the former capital of South Yemen, would have been a part of the Aden region, but would have had special legislative and executive powers. Each region was to be further divided into states, which would have taken the place of Yemen's existing governorates. The conclusions of the Conference formed the basis of a new constitution, which was to be put to a referendum in 2015. 

The plan for a six-region federation received international praise, but was denounced by many within Yemen. The Southern Movement suspected that the division of the south into two regions was an attempt to turn southern secessionists against each other; they preferred a two-region division between the north and the south. The Zaidi elites in the Azal region would have been left with almost no natural resources, whereas the sparsely populated Saba and Hadhramaut regions would have received nearly all of the country's natural resources. Meanwhile, the Houthis were outraged that the plan would have landlocked their home governorate of Saada. The referendum on the new federal constitution was indefinitely delayed by the intensification of the Yemeni Civil War in 2015. Some commentators have cited Hadi's federalization plan as one of the main causes of the civil war.

Flags of the regions

See also
 Federalization of Syria

References

Yemeni peace process
Yemen
Decentralization
Proposals in Asia
Proposed political divisions
Public policy proposals